Ralph Lee Sampson Jr. (born July 7, 1960) is an American former professional basketball player. He is a member of the Naismith Memorial Basketball Hall of Fame. A  phenom, three-time college national player of the year, and first overall selection in the 1983 NBA draft, Sampson brought heavy expectations with him to the National Basketball Association (NBA).

The NBA Rookie of the Year, Sampson averaged 20.7 points and 10.9 rebounds for his first three seasons with the Houston Rockets before injuries began to take their toll. Three knee surgeries later he retired in 1995 as a four-time NBA All-Star and the NBA All-Star Game Most Valuable Player (MVP) in the 1985 NBA All-Star Game.

Early life

He averaged nearly 30 points, 19 rebounds, and 7 blocked shots as a senior (after averaging 14 points and 11 rebounds as a sophomore, and 19 points and 17 rebounds as a junior), at Harrisonburg High, leading the team to state AA basketball championships in 1978 and 1979. His senior year he lost the high school player of the year award to another talented center, Sam Bowie. However, he did get a form of revenge against Bowie, outplaying him in the Capital Classic, getting 23 points and 21 rebounds with 4 blocks in a game styled "Battle of the Giants".

College career

Sampson was arguably the most heavily recruited college basketball prospect of his generation and appeared on the cover of Sports Illustrated six times in a span of fewer than four years (December 17, 1979; December 1, 1980; March 30, 1981; November 29, 1982; December 20, 1982; and October 31, 1983).

Playing center for the University of Virginia, he led the Cavaliers to an NIT title in 1980, an NCAA Final Four appearance in 1981, and an NCAA Elite Eight appearance in 1983. He earned three Naismith Awards as the National Player of the Year, only the second athlete to do so (Bill Walton was the first), and a pair of Wooden Awards. Sampson considered leaving Virginia after his junior year and declaring for the 1982 NBA draft. The San Diego Clippers and Los Angeles Lakers would flip a coin to determine who would draft first overall, but the deadline for Sampson to make himself available came before the scheduled coin flip. Rather than risk playing for the Clippers (who ended up losing the toss), Sampson stayed in school.

Professional career

Houston Rockets (1983–1987)
With his size and agility Sampson was expected to score like Wilt Chamberlain and win championships like Bill Russell when he reached the National Basketball Association. The Houston Rockets picked him first overall in the 1983 NBA draft. As a rookie, he averaged 21.0 points and 11.1 rebounds, played in the All-Star Game, and won the NBA Rookie of the Year Award.

The Rockets managed only a 29–53 record in 1983–84, which qualified them to pick first in the 1984 NBA draft. Houston selected fellow center Hakeem Olajuwon out of the University of Houston. Many observers criticized the Rockets' choice, believing the two 7-footers (known as the Twin Towers) would not be effective playing together, while others thought the combination could be overpowering. Sampson, playing a new style of power forward, had new expectations placed upon him. At the time, Dallas Mavericks Coach Dick Motta said, "That front line, when history is written when they've grown up, might be the best-assembled on one team. Ever." Houston guard John Lucas said of Sampson's move to forward, "He'll revolutionize the game."

In 1984–85 the Rockets improved by 19 games to 48–34 and made the playoffs for the first time in three seasons. Sampson had his best individual campaign, averaging 22.1 points and 10.4 rebounds and earning a berth on the All-NBA Second Team. He and Olajuwon both played in the 1985 NBA All-Star Game, and Sampson, after scoring 24 points and grabbing 10 rebounds, earned the game's MVP Award. On March 5, 1985, in a loss against the Denver Nuggets, Sampson recorded 30 points, 15 rebounds, 8 assists, and 5 steals and was the first player in NBA history to record at least 30 points, 15 rebounds, 5 assists, and 5 steals since the league started recording steals.

The next season Houston won the Midwest Division with a 51–31 record. In the playoffs, the Rockets swept the Sacramento Kings, but faced a stiffer challenge against Alex English and the Denver Nuggets in the Conference Semi-Finals, eventually winning the series 4–2, with the sixth and deciding game going to double overtime. Against the defending champion Lakers in the Conference Finals, the Rockets were ready to knock off their rivals who had the best of them during the season. The Rockets lost game 1, but the Rockets fought back, winning four straight to take the series four games to one. In-Game 5 of that series, Sampson provided one of the most memorable moments in NBA Playoff history. With the score tied at 112, Olajuwon having earlier been ejected, and with only one second remaining on the clock, Sampson took an inbounds pass and launched a twisting turnaround jumper that sailed through the hoop at the buzzer, giving the Rockets a 114–112 victory and a shocking series upset.

In the NBA Finals, the Rockets faced the Boston Celtics. Boston sportswriters were not happy about not getting revenge against the Lakers who had beaten the Celtics in the Finals the year before, but the matchup was interesting with the young frontcourt challenging the old guard of the Celtics. During the season at the Boston Garden, the Rockets were playing the Celtics well until Sampson suffered a jarring fall on his back. At the start of the Finals, Sampson quickly found himself in foul trouble early in Game 1 as Boston easily went up 2-0 going back to Houston. The Rockets won a close Game 3 under the leadership of Sampson. Game 4 also went down to the wire with the Celtics pulling it out on late Larry Bird 3-pointer heroics and untimely turnovers by Rockets guard Mitch Wiggins. In a similarly close Game 5 in Houston (under the 2–3–2 format), Sampson succumbed to taunting by Boston's much smaller 6-foot-1 backup guard Jerry Sichting resulting in Sampson taking a swing and earning an ejection from the game. Strangely, this fired up the Rockets, who won Game 5 by 15 points without Ralph thanks to the inspired play of Olajuwon, Jim Petersen, and Robert "Bobby Jo" Reid. Game 6 went back to Boston with Sampson finding himself again in foul trouble and of little effect against the older and wiser Celtic frontcourt of Larry Bird, Kevin McHale and Robert Parish. After the series, Boston coach KC Jones called the Rockets "the new monsters on the block", with the future looking very bright for the Rockets. During the six-game championship series loss against the Celtics, Sampson averaged 14.8 points on .438 shooting, 9.5 rebounds and 3.3 assists per game.

Golden State Warriors (1987–1989)

Injured halfway into the 1987–88 season, Sampson fell out of favor with Rockets Coach Bill Fitch and was traded, along with guard Steve Harris, to the Golden State Warriors for Eric "Sleepy" Floyd and Joe Barry Carroll. Sampson's knee and back troubles worsened, and he never played a full season in the remaining years of his NBA career.

Sacramento Kings (1989–1991)
Sampson averaged 6.4 points and 5.0 rebounds with Golden State in 1988–89 and was traded during the offseason to the Sacramento Kings for Jim Petersen. Sampson's injury issues continued in Sacramento as he totaled just 51 games in two seasons, averaging 4.2 and 3.0 points, respectively, in 1989–90 and 1990–91.

Washington Bullets (1991–1992)
Released by the Kings, Sampson played a 10-game stint with the Washington Bullets in 1991–92 before being waived. He played 441 games in 10 NBA seasons, slightly more than half the 820 scheduled.

Unicaja Ronda (1992)
Sampson played eight games for Unicaja Ronda of the Spanish League during the 1991–92 season.

Rockford Lightning (1994–1995)
Sampson also would play for the Rockford Lightning in the Continental Basketball Association during the 1994–95 season before ultimately retiring for good.

Coaching career
Returning to the United States, Sampson spent the 1992–93 season as an assistant to head coach Lefty Driesell at James Madison University before coaching a minor league professional team in Richmond, Virginia, named the Richmond Rhythm.

In October 2012, Sampson joined the Phoenix Suns' player development staff. In June 2013, Sampson announced that he would not return as an assistant head coach.

Legacy
In 1996, Sampson was inducted into the Virginia Sports Hall of Fame. In 2002, he was named to the ACC 50th Anniversary men's basketball team as one of the 50 greatest players in Atlantic Coast Conference history and one of only three Virginia Cavaliers so honored.

On November 22, 2011, Sampson was inducted into the National Collegiate Basketball Hall of Fame. In February 2012, Sampson was honored by Houston Rockets and fans as a member of the Decade Team of the 1980s. On April 2, 2012, Sampson was named a member of the Naismith Memorial Basketball Hall of Fame's induction class of 2012.

Personal life
Sampson has four children by his ex-wife. Their oldest son, Ralph III, played collegiate basketball for Minnesota. Their younger son, Robert, transferred to Georgia Tech after playing his first three seasons (2010–2013) of college basketball for East Carolina University. They have two daughters: Rachel, who graduated from Stanford University and worked at ESPN, and Anna.

Sampson has four other children by four women, including daughters named Leah and India.

Reflecting on his career and its three knee surgeries, Sampson admitted that he had attempted to come back too quickly from them, and said that he tried not to think about what could have been.

Legal issues
In 2005, Sampson pleaded guilty to owing more than $300K in back child support for two children from different mothers in the Northern Virginia area. In 2006, he was sentenced to two months in prison for mail fraud associated with the purchase of an SUV.

Awards
 Naismith College Player of the Year (1981–1983)
 USBWA College Player of the Year (1981–1983)
 Adolph Rupp Trophy (1981–1983)
 Associated Press Player of the Year (1981–1983)
 UPI Player of the Year (1981–1983)
 John R. Wooden Award (1982–1983)
 NABC Player of the Year (1982–1983)
 Golden Plate Award of the American Academy of Achievement presented by Awards Council member Herschel Walker (1982)
  Sporting News Player of the Year (1983)
 Co-Helms Foundation College Basketball Player of the Year (1982)
 NBA Rookie of the Year (1984)
 NBA All-Rookie Team (1984)
 NBA All-Star Game MVP (1985)
 NBA All-Star (1984–1987)
 All-NBA Second Team selection (1985)
 National Collegiate Basketball Hall of Fame inductee (2011)
 Naismith Basketball Hall of Fame inductee (2012)

Career statistics

NBA

Regular season

|-
| style="text-align:left;"|
| style="text-align:left;"|Houston
| 82 || 82 || 32.8 || .523 || .250 || .661 || 11.1 || 2.0 || .9 || 2.4 || 21.0
|-
| style="text-align:left;"|
| style="text-align:left;"|Houston
| 82 || 82 || 37.6 || .502 || .000 || .676 || 10.4 || 2.7 || 1.0 || 2.0 || 22.1
|-
| style="text-align:left;"|
| style="text-align:left;"|Houston
|| 79 || 76 || 36.3 || .488 || .133 || .641 || 11.1 || 3.6 || 1.3 || 1.6 || 18.9
|-
| style="text-align:left;"|
| style="text-align:left;"|Houston
| 43 || 32 || 30.8 || .489 || .000 || .624 || 8.7 || 2.8 || .9 || 1.3 || 15.6
|-
| style="text-align:left;"|
| style="text-align:left;"|Houston
| 19 || 19 || 37.1 || .439 || .333 || .741 || 9.1 || 1.9 || .9 || 1.7 || 15.9
|-
| style="text-align:left;"|
| style="text-align:left;"|Golden State
| 29 || 25 || 33.0 || .438 || .000 || .775 || 10.0 || 2.9 || .8 || 1.9 || 15.4
|-
| style="text-align:left;"|
| style="text-align:left;"|Golden State
| 61 || 36 || 17.8 || .449 || .375 || .653 || 5.0 || 1.3 || .5 || 1.1 || 6.4
|-
| style="text-align:left;"|
| style="text-align:left;"|Sacramento
| 26 || 7 || 16.0 || .372 || .250 || .522 || 3.2 || 1.1 || .5 || .8 || 4.2
|-
| style="text-align:left;"|
| style="text-align:left;"|Sacramento
| 25 || 4 || 13.9 || .366 || .200 || .263 || 4.4 || .7 || .4 || .7 || 3.0
|-
| style="text-align:left;"|
| style="text-align:left;"|Washington
| 10 || 0 || 10.8 || .310 || .000 || .667 || 3.0 || .4 || .3 || .8 || 2.2
|- class="sortbottom"
| style="text-align:center;" colspan="2"|Career
| 456 || 363 || 29.8 || .486 || .172 || .661 || 8.8 || 2.3 || .9 || 1.6 || 15.4
|- class="sortbottom"
| style="text-align:center;" colspan="2"|All-Star
| 3 || 2 || 22.0 || .636 ||  || .700 || 6.3 || .7 || .0 || .3 || 16.3

Playoffs

|-
| style="text-align:left;"|1985
| style="text-align:left;"|Houston
| 5 || 5 || 38.6 || .430 || 1.000 || .514 || 16.6 || 1.4 || .4 || 1.6 || 21.2
|-
| style="text-align:left;"|1986
| style="text-align:left;"|Houston
| 20 || 20 || 37.1 || .518 || 1.000 || .729 || 10.8 || 4.0 || 1.5 || 1.8 || 20.0
|-
| style="text-align:left;"|1987
| style="text-align:left;"|Houston
| 10 || 10 || 33.0 || .514 || .500 || .814 || 8.8 || 2.1 || .2 || 1.2 || 18.6
|-
| style="text-align:left;"|1989
| style="text-align:left;"|Golden State
| 3 || 1 || 14.3 || .409 || .000 || .500 || 4.7 || .3 || .3 || .7 || 6.7
|- class="sortbottom"
| style="text-align:center;" colspan="2"|Career
| 38 || 36 || 34.4 || .497 || .375 || .703 || 10.5 || 2.9 || .9 || 1.5 || 18.7

College

|-
| style="text-align:left;"|1979–80
| style="text-align:left;"|Virginia
| 34 ||  || 29.9 || .547 ||  || .702 || 11.2 || 1.1 || .8 || 4.6 || 14.9
|-
| style="text-align:left;"|1980–81
| style="text-align:left;"|Virginia
| 33 || 31 || 32.0 || .557 ||  || .631 || 11.5 || 1.5 || .8 || 3.1 || 17.7
|-
| style="text-align:left;"|1981–82
| style="text-align:left;"|Virginia
| 32 || 31 || 31.3 || .561 ||  || .615 || 11.4 || 1.2 || .6 || 3.1 || 15.8
|-
| style="text-align:left;"|1982–83
| style="text-align:left;"|Virginia
| 33 || 33 || 30.2 || .604 ||  || .704 || 11.7 || 1.0 || .6 || 3.1 || 19.0

See also
List of National Basketball Association players with most blocks in a game
List of tallest players in National Basketball Association history
List of NCAA Division I men's basketball career rebounding leaders
List of NCAA Division I men's basketball players with 2000 points and 1000 rebounds

References

Bibliography
University of Virginia Basketball Media Guide (PDF copy available at www.virginiasports.com)

External links
 
 NBA Draft Profile TheDraftReview.com

1960 births
Living people
20th-century African-American sportspeople
21st-century African-American people
African-American basketball players
All-American college men's basketball players
American expatriate basketball people in Spain
American men's basketball players
Baloncesto Málaga players
Basketball coaches from Virginia
Basketball players at the 1979 Pan American Games
Basketball players from Virginia
Centers (basketball)
Golden State Warriors players
Houston Rockets draft picks
Houston Rockets players
International Basketball League (1999–2001) coaches
Liga ACB players
McDonald's High School All-Americans
Medalists at the 1979 Pan American Games
Milwaukee Bucks assistant coaches
Naismith Memorial Basketball Hall of Fame inductees
National Basketball Association All-Stars
National Collegiate Basketball Hall of Fame inductees
Pan American Games gold medalists for the United States
Pan American Games medalists in basketball
Parade High School All-Americans (boys' basketball)
People from Harrisonburg, Virginia
Phoenix Suns assistant coaches
Power forwards (basketball)
Rockford Lightning players
Sacramento Kings players
Virginia Cavaliers men's basketball players
Washington Bullets players